Mark Plotyczer (born 19 February 1987) is a British volleyball player. Born in Rio de Janeiro, Brazil, he competed for Great Britain in the men's tournament at the 2012 Summer Olympics.

References

British men's volleyball players
Volleyball players at the 2012 Summer Olympics
Olympic volleyball players of Great Britain
1987 births
Living people
Volleyball players from Rio de Janeiro (city)